Rodney Forbes (born 18 September 1967 in Sydney) is a former racing driver from Australia. He is best known for his participation in the V8 Supercars between 1999 and 2003.

Career results

Complete Bathurst 1000 results

* Super Touring race

References

External links
 Profile at Driver Database

1967 births
Living people
Racing drivers from Sydney